An aviator is a person who flies aircraft.

Aviator may also refer to:

Films 
 The Aviator (1929 film), a comedy film considered lost
 The Aviator (1985 film), an adventure film starring Christopher Reeve
 The Aviator (2004 film), a biopic based on the life of entrepreneur Howard Hughes

Music 
 Aviator (British band), a late 1970s progressive rock band
 Aviator (Aviator album), Aviator's first album
 Aviator (Ukrainian band), pop band formed in 2005
 Aviator (Funker Vogt album), a 2007 album by Funker Vogt
 "The Aviator", a song by Deep Purple from their 1996 album Purpendicular
 The Aviator (soundtrack), the original soundtrack album of the 2004 film The Aviator

Other uses 
 Aviator, a 1983 computer game by Geoff Crammond
 Aviator, a brand of playing cards made by the United States Playing Card Company
 Aviator (rank), a rank within the Royal Canadian Air Force
 Aviators, former Frequent Flyer Program of Trans World Airlines
 Honda Aviator, a motor scooter made by Honda Motorcycle and Scooter India Pvt. Ltd.
 Lincoln Aviator, an SUV
 Ray-Ban Aviator, a style of sunglasses
 Shenzhen Aviators, a Chinese basketball team
 The Aviator (short story), a 1926 short story by Antoine de Saint-Exupéry
 The Aviator (Charlottesville, Virginia), a sculpture by Gutzon Borglum

See also 
 Pilot (disambiguation)